Sheffield Galleries and Museums Trust, known as Museums Sheffield is a charity created in 1998 to run Sheffield City Council’s non-industrial museums and galleries. Museums Sheffield currently manages three sites in the city: Graves Art Gallery, Millennium Gallery and Weston Park Museum. It is run from offices at Leader House on Surrey Street.

The trust is responsible for the care of the city's historic collections, including visual and decorative art, social history, archaeology and natural sciences. Its mission is 'to connect with our visitors, share stories about Sheffield and the wider world, and care for the city's collections'.

See also
 Sheffield Industrial Museums Trust

External links

 Official website

 
Galleries and Museums Trust
Sheffield Galleries and Museums Trust
Sheffield Galleries and Museums Trust
Lists of museums in the United Kingdom
Sheffield Galleries and Museums Trust
Charities based in Sheffield